Jitu is a village in Iran

Jitu or Jeetu may also refer to:

Places
 Jitu, Siliguri, a census town in Darjeeling district, India

People with the given name
 Jitu Jirati (born 1976), an Indian politician
 Jitu Patnaik, an Indian politician
 Jitu Patwari (born 1973), Indian politician
 Jitu Rai (born 1996), Indian shooter of Nepalese origin
 Jitu Soni (born 1969), Tanzanian CCM politician
 Jitu Vaghani (born 1970), an Indian politician
 Jitu Weusi (1939–2013), an American educator, education advocate, author, a community leader, writer, activist, mentor, jazz and art program promoter
 Jeetu Nepal, a Nepali stand-up comedian
 Jeetu Verma, a Bollywood actor

Nepalese masculine given names
Indian masculine given names